Kundakka Mandakka is a 2005 Indian Tamil-language comedy film directed by Ashokan and produced by SG Films. The film stars Parthiban, Vadivelu, Raai Laxmi, and Mallika. The music was composed by Bharadwaj, while editing was done by Suresh Urs. The film released on 14 October 2005.

Plot
The movie is about Ilangovan, aka Ilango (Parthiban), a middle-class youth who dreams to get his sister Kavitha (Mallika) married to a millionaire. He is very keen on becoming rich and falls in love with Roopa (Lakshmi Rai), daughter of a rich industrialist. Now and then, Ilango comes across Chellappa (Vadivelu), a petty thief, and takes him for a fun ride. A sequence of events makes Ilango realize that money is not everything in life. He, with Chellappa's help, finally works to get his sister married to the boy that she loves.

Cast

 Parthiban as Ilangovan aka Ilango
 Vadivelu as Chellappa
 Raai Laxmi as Roopa
 Mallika as Kavitha
 Kalairani as Ilango's mother
 Amruth Kalam as Nandhu
 Mohan Raman
 Singamuthu
 Madhan Bob
 Chaams
 Bhuvaneswari
 Aarthi
 Thyagu

Production
The film marked director Asokan Subramanian's third feature film following Thamizhachi (1995) and Ponvizha (1999).

Soundtrack
The music was composed by Bharadwaj.

Critical reception

The movie received mixed reviews from critics

Malathi Rangarajan of The Hindu wrote, "Don't look for coherence or logic in "Kundakka Mandakka", because most of the time it is inane humour that rules."

Sify  wrote, "Enough endured. Instead of viewing this farce, stay at home and watch cartoon network!"

Behindwoods  said, "Kundakka Mandakka is a movie for the front benchers and is a sure hit in the B and C theatres. Asokan, a debutant director, literally scares the masses with the presentation."

Indiaglitz stated, "Parthiban as usual comes up with tricks, which always ends up Vadivelu in trouble, and is pretty sharp in his repartee and witticisms. He has a way with words and it comes naturally to him. Vadivelu provides relief at many places in the movie while Lakshmi Rai oozes glamour all through. Director Ashokan shows some sparkle in handling earthy humor. Though the essential idea is old, the film does evoke plenty of laughs."

References

2005 films
2000s Tamil-language films
Films scored by Bharadwaj (composer)